Frida Baranek (born 1961) is a Brazilian sculptor known for creating large sculptural works that incorporate fibers and industrial materials such as plates, rods, and iron or steel wires as commentary on industrialization and the environment in Brazil.

Biography 
Frida Baranek was born in Rio de Janeiro. She graduated from Universidade Santa Úrsula, with a bachelor's degree in architecture in 1983, and from Parsons School of Design with a master's degree in sculpture in 1985. She has lived and worked in São Paulo, Paris, Berlin, and New York City. Frida currently live in Miami. She owns one studio in Rio de Janeiro and one in Miami.

Career 
She creates organic forms and subjects using inorganic materials e.g., "Untitled," (1985) stone, wood boxes, bulbs and electric wire, and "Como vai você, Geração 80? [How are you, Generation 80?]," (1984), Steel. "Como vai você, Geração 80?" is incorporated into and organic material (water) and it flows throughout the water seamlessly. Sculptures such as "Dormindo em Veneza [Sleeping in Venice]", (1990), "Bolo [Cake]", (1990), and Não classificado [Unclassified], (1992) incorporate puffs of steel wool and sheets of steel that shimmer like constellations.

Others take the form of fences and screens to evoke mass and space e.g. Untitled, (1988) iron flexible, plates and stones and Untitled, (1991) steel rods and wire. Latent references to women's work are also incorporated in her sculptures. The artist also knits and weaves thin thread into womb and bag-like forms like in her sculpture "Swirls Bege," (2008). Baranek's overwhelming tangles and whiskered sacs refer to the sexual symbol of women's hair; this is not only a symbol of inclination, but of danger as well. Other materials used in her sculptures are stones, springs, bars, glass, air chambers, tires, rubber balls, water, sand, etc.

In 1984, in a selected group exhibition called "Como vai você, Geração 80?" at the Escola de Artes Visuais in Rio de Janeiro, Brazil, Baranek created a stained plastic buoy floating in Rodrigo de Freitas Lake. The buoy is similar to the shape of the Dois Irmãos Mountain, that is close to the exhibition and is 0.9 meters wide and 30. meters long. The buoy is surrounded by water. The sculpture's satin surface that is silver reflects light bouncing off the water. Baranek's sculptures reflect a skewed reality, strangeness, and unexpected poetical relationships.

Her works are held by the São Paulo Museum of Modern Art, Museum of Contemporary Art, University of São Paulo, the Kemper Art Museum, and the National Museum of Women in the Arts.

Family
She was married to journalist Roger Cohen and has four children. They divorced in 2015.

Exhibitions
1985 Petite Galerie, Rio de Janeiro
1988 Galeria Sérgio Millet, Rio de Janeiro
1990 Gabinete de Arte Raquel Arnaud, São Paulo
1993 Stux Gallery, New York
1993 ULTRAMODERN: The Art of Contemporary Brazil, National Museum of Women in the Arts
1996 Gabinete de Arte Raquel Arnaud, São Paulo
1999 La Maison du Brésil, Brussels
2001 Gabinete de Arte Raquel Arnaud, São Paulo
2004 HAP Galeria, Rio de Janeiro
2006 Frida Baranek - Lavish Pause / Lange Pause, Galerie im Traklhaus, Salzburg
2009 Gabinete de Arte Raquel Arnaud, São Paulo, Brazil
2013 Museu de Arte Moderna, Rio de Janeiro, Brazi
2013 H.A.P. Galeria, Rio de Janeiro, Brazil
2014 Gabinete de Arte Raquel Arnaud, São Paulo, Brazil
2014 Heike Moras Art, London, UK
2017 Untitled Art Fair, Miami, USA
2019 "Liminality", Gabinete de Arte Raquel Arnaud, São Paulo, Brasil

Awards 

 1992 Fulbright International Fellowship in the Visual Arts, USA
 1993 Studio Residency, Paris
 2019 Studio Residency, Miami
 2019 Women Who Make History, Miami
 2019 Recipient of the Joan Mitchell Foundation Painters and Sculptors Grants

References

External links
http://www.kemperartmuseum.wustl.edu/islandpress/html/A002.html
http://brunodavidgallery.com/artistDetail.cfm?id_artist=59
http://www.arch.wustl.edu/collection/explore/artist/66 
http://www.fridabaranek.com/about/
https://www.independent.co.uk/news/media/roger-cohen-my-life-in-media-436014.html

1961 births
Brazilian people of Polish descent
Brazilian sculptors
Artists from Rio de Janeiro (city)
Parsons School of Design alumni
Living people
Brazilian contemporary artists